This list covers various types of educational institutions in the city of Bhopal, Madhya Pradesh.

Universities
 Atal Bihari Vajpayee Hindi Vishwavidyalaya
 Barkatullah University
 Jagran Lakecity University
 LNCT University
 Madhya Pradesh Bhoj Open University
 Makhanlal Chaturvedi National University of Journalism and Communication
 Rabindranath Tagore University
 Rajiv Gandhi Proudyogiki Vishwavidyalaya
 RKDF University
 SAM Global University

Institutions of national importance
 Indian Institute of Forest Management (IIFM Bhopal)
 Indian Institutes of Information Technology (IIIT Bhopal)
 Indian Institute of Science Education and Research (IISER)
 Maulana Azad National Institute of Technology (MANIT)
 National Institute of Design (NID Bhopal)
 National Institute of Fashion Technology (NIFT Bhopal)
 National Law Institute University
 School of Planning and Architecture, Bhopal (SPA Bhopal)

Medical colleges 
 AIIMS, Bhopal
 Gandhi Medical College, Bhopal
 People's College of Medical Sciences and Research

Private engineering colleges 
 Lakshmi Narain College of Technology, Bhopal (1994)
 Oriental Institute of Science and Technology, Bhopal (1995)
 Patel College of Science & Technology Bhopal (2008)
 Radharaman Institute of Technology & Science, Bhopal (2003)
 Technocrats Institute of Technology, (TIT) Bhopal (1999)
 Sagar Institute of Science and Technology

Notable schools
 Campion School (boys-only) (CBSE)
 Carmel Convent School (girls-only) (CBSE)
 Delhi Public School, Bhopal (CBSE)
 The Sanskaar Valley School (ICSE and Cambridge A Levels)
 St Joseph's Co-Ed School, Bhopal (CBSE)
 St Joseph's Convent School, Bhopal (girls-only) (CBSE)
 St. Xavier's School, Bhopal (CBSE)

References

Education in Bhopal
Bhopal